Ali & Ava is a 2021 British drama film written and directed by Clio Barnard. The film stars Adeel Akhtar and Claire Rushbrook in the lead roles. It had its world premiere at the 74th Cannes Film Festival in the Directors Fortnight section on 11 July 2021 and was released in the United Kingdom on 4 March 2022.

Synopsis
The film is set in Bradford, a working-class, predominantly white housing estate of Holme Wood, noted in both reality around 2016 and in the film for racist anti-social behaviour towards taxi drivers.

Ali, a man of Pakistani descent, lives with his soon-to-be ex-wife, Runa, who still mourns the loss of their unborn child. Ava lives in Holme Wood near her adult children, some of whom have children of their own.

Ali and Ava meet one day at the school where Ava works when Ali drops off his tenant's daughter. A friendship, built on a mutual love of music, gradually develops between the two, and deepens into something more as the couple struggles to overcome their respective familial entanglements and prejudices.

Cast and characters
 Adeel Akhtar as Ali
 Claire Rushbrook as Ava
 Ellora Torchia as Ali's separated wife, Runa
 Shaun Thomas as Ava's son, Callum
 Natalie Gavin as Dawn
 Mona Goodwin as Ava's daughter, Michelle
 Sienna Afsar as Ali's niece
 Siraj Hussain as Hashim

Production
In January 2020, it was announced that Adeel Akhtar and Claire Rushbrook had joined the cast of the film, with Clio Barnard directing from a screenplay she wrote. BBC Film would produce, and Altitude Film Distribution was set to distribute in the United Kingdom.

Release
The film had its world premiere at the 74th Cannes Film Festival in the Directors Fortnight section on 11 July 2021. It was theatrically released in the United Kingdom on 4 March 2022 and came out on VOD on 23 August 2022.

Reception

Box office
Ali & Ava grossed $44,072 in the United States and Canada and $843,713 in other territories, for a worldwide total of $887,785.

Critical response
On review aggregator Rotten Tomatoes, the film holds an approval rating of 94% based on 88 reviews, with an average rating of 7.6/10. The website's critical consensus reads, "Ali & Avas tender, naturalistic love story adds another powerful chapter to writer–director Clio Barnard's filmography." On Metacritic, the film holds a weighted average score of 75 out of 100 based on 19 critics, indicating "generally favorable reviews".

References

External links
 
 

2021 drama films
2020s English-language films
British drama films
BBC Film films
Films directed by Clio Barnard
Films set in Yorkshire
Films set in Bradford
2020s British films